Petrești is a commune of 1,588 inhabitants situated in Satu Mare County, Romania. It is composed of two villages, Dindeștiu Mic (Kisdengeleg) and Petrești.

In 1740, count Sándor Károlyi colonized the village with a German population. 
In the commune, tourists can visit the Petrești Swabian Museum, a household typical of traditional Swabian architecture.

Demographics
Ethnic groups (2002 census): 
Hungarians: 794 (47.17%)
Romanians: 199 (11.82%)
Germans (Sathmar Swabians): 530 (31.49%)
Romanies (Gypsies): 159 (9.44%)

According to mother tongue, 73% speak Hungarian as their first language, while 14.31% speak German and 12.65% of the population speak Romanian.

Ethnic groups (2011 census, provisional data):

Total: 1,572
Hungarians: 749 (47.65%)
Romanians: 199 (12.66%)
Germans (Sathmar Swabians): 437 (27.80%)
Romanies (Gypsies): 171 (10.88%)

References

Communes in Satu Mare County
Hungarian German communities